Al-Lumi is a small village in Jabal Iyal Yazid District of 'Amran Governorate, Yemen. It is located on the slopes of Jabal Iyal Yazid, 3km north-northeast of Da‘‘an.

History 
The earliest known mention of al-Lumi in historical sources is in 1068 (460 AH). Historical sources mentioning it include the Ghayat al-amani of Yahya ibn al-Husayn, the Kitab al-Simt of Muhammad ibn Hatim al-Yami al-Hamdani, and the al-Sulayhiyyun of Husayn al-Hamdani.

References 

Populated places in 'Amran Governorate